Alice Springs Golf Club is a golf club in Australia. It is located in Desert Springs, Northern Territory. It was formed in 1985. It has hosted several notable golf tournaments.

The Alice Springs Golf Course, an 18-hole championship layout golf course designed by the architects Thomson Wolveridge, was opened in 1985 by a challenge match between top professionals Greg Norman and Johnny Miller. The course record of 64 is held jointly by, amateur members, Leigh Shacklady and Kerryn Heaver, beating professional Stuart Appleby's 65. Adam Scott won the Australian Boys' Amateur Championship held there in 1997.

References

External links

1985 establishments in Australia
Sports clubs established in 1985
Sports venues completed in 1985
Golf clubs and courses in the Northern Territory
Sport in Alice Springs
Buildings and structures in Alice Springs
Bowls in Australia
Bowls clubs
Sports venues in the Northern Territory